Stearns is a census-designated place (CDP) in McCreary County, Kentucky, United States. The population was 1,586 at the 2000 census. It was founded by Justus Smith Stearns.

Geography
Stearns is located at  (36.697976, -84.476776).

Climate

According to the Köppen Climate Classification system, Stearns has a humid subtropical climate, abbreviated "Cfa" on climate maps.

Demographics

At the 2000 census, there were 1,586 people, 641 households and 464 families residing in the CDP. The racial makeup of the CDP was 98.36% White, 0.95% Native American, 0.06% from other races, and 0.63% from two or more races. Hispanic or Latino of any race were 0.38% of the population.

There were 641 households, of which 30.7% had children under the age of 18 living with them, 51.0% were married couples living together, 14.7% had a female householder with no husband present, and 27.6% were non-families. 26.2% of all households were made up of individuals, and 11.5% had someone living alone who was 65 years of age or older. The average household size was 2.46 and the average family size was 2.92.

Age distribution was 24.0% under the age of 18, 8.6% from 18 to 24, 28.0% from 25 to 44, 27.3% from 45 to 64, and 12.1% who were 65 years of age or older. The median age was 38 years. For every 100 females, there were 89.0 males. For every 100 females age 18 and over, there were 85.4 males.

The median household income was $20,833, and the median family income was $26,667. Males had a median income of $21,546 versus $18,750 for females. The per capita income for the CDP was $11,037. About 14.1% of families and 22.3% of the population were below the poverty line, including 24.9% of those under age 18 and 30.5% of those age 65 or over.

Education
Stearns is home to McCreary Central High School and McCreary Middle School.

Climate
The climate in this area is characterized by hot, humid summers and generally mild to cool winters. According to the Köppen Climate Classification system, Stearns has a humid subtropical climate, abbreviated "Cfa" on climate maps.

See also 
 Barthell, Kentucky: Stearns Coal and Lumber Company town in McCreary County, Kentucky
 Blue Heron, Kentucky: Stearns Coal and Lumber Company town in McCreary County, Kentucky
 McCreary County Museum: Former headquarters of Stearns Coal and Lumber Company

References

Census-designated places in McCreary County, Kentucky
Census-designated places in Kentucky
Mining communities in Kentucky
Company towns in Kentucky